Filatima abactella is a moth of the family Gelechiidae. It is found in North America, where it has been recorded from Alberta, British Columbia, New Brunswick, New Mexico, Ontario, Quebec and Wyoming.

References

Moths described in 1932
Filatima